Air Vice Marshal Anthony Ebehijele Okpere is a retired Nigerian Airforce Officer, former Managing Director of Nigerian Airways and Minister of Aviation and member of the Federal Executive Council in 1987.

Early life and education
AVM Okpere was born on September 28, 1943, in  Uromi, Edo state, Nigeria. 
He attended Government Primary School, Uromi for his primary education before enrolling at Ishan Grammar School, Uromi for his secondary education.

Upon completion of secondary school, he enlisted in the military Command and Staff College, Jaji, 1979. He furthered his military education at the Air War College, Air University, Maxwell Air Force Base, Alabama, USA and Air War College.

Career and appointments

 1963:  Held several key appointments at the Squadron and Wing levels Nigeria Air Force
 1967-79: Director of Operations, Air Force Headquarters, Lagos
 1979-83: Member, Governing Council, University of Benin, Benin City 
 1979-82: Director, Air Faculty, Command and Staff College, Jaji 
 1983-84: joined the Nigerian Air Force as Cadet Officer
 1984-86: appointed Managing Director, Nigeria Air Ways Limited 
 1986-87: Minister of Aviation 
 December 1987-February 1989: Air Officer Commanding, Training Command Nigerian Air Force, Kaduna
Source:

Personal life
He married Veronica Isibor in 1968, and they have a son and three daughters.

References

1943 births
Living people
Nigerian Air Force air marshals
People from Edo State